The Door Within is a Christian fantasy trilogy by American young-adult fiction author Wayne Thomas Batson, published between 2005 and 2006. The series was published by Thomas Nelson. 

In 2007, the series was featured in a Washington Post article about the increasing popularity at the time of Christian fantasy novels. The first book of the trilogy was also reviewed by the Pittsburgh Post-Gazette in August of the same year. The following year, the trilogy received praise from the Tuscaloosa News, citing it as one of several recent releases contributing to an "explosive interest in religious books" and an acceptance of Christian fiction in mainstream retail outlets. As of May 2022, the trilogy has collectively garnered over 17,000 ratings and 900 user reviews on the social book cataloging and reviewing website Goodreads.

Books
The Door Within (released on April 8, 2005)
Rise of the Wyrm Lord (released on July 10, 2006)
The Final Storm (released on September 11, 2006)

Premise

In a parallel universe known as "the Realm," humanoid inhabitants known as "Glimpses" correspond to each person on Earth in general appearance, personality, allegiance/beliefs, and time of death, though not necessarily in age. Glimpses have white skin and eyes that change color according to their loyalties. If a human chooses to believe that the "Story" of the Realm (also known as The Book of Alleble) is true, the Glimpse will side with King Eliam, the Godlike king of Alleble, whereupon its eyes glint blue; if a human chooses to scorn the Story, the Glimpse sides with the rebel Paragor (a Lucifer-like character who is the principal villain of the series), whereupon its eyes glint red; if the human does not choose either, the Glimpse will remain independent and its eyes will glint green. Similarly, if the Glimpse changes its loyalty, the human changes its opinion. The color signifying loyalty can only be seen when the Glimpse moves or from a sideways angle; when seen from the front, Glimpse eyes are as various in color as human eyes, and may or may not match those of the human to whom a Glimpse corresponds.

Upon dying, each Glimpse is united with its human and transcends both worlds in favor of an afterlife. Followers of King Eliam join their master in a world known as the 'Sacred Realm Beyond the Sun', whereas followers of Paragor become imprisoned beneath his citadel, behind the 'Gates of Despair'.

In the third book of the series, The Final Storm, the two worlds reunite into one, so that all separation and distinction between each Glimpse and the human to which it corresponds ceases to exist.

Major characters

Aidan Thomas: The main character: At first concerned only with his own convenience (or lack thereof), Aidan becomes brave, loyal, and self-sacrificing after he enters Alleble. Invited by King Eliam, he enters the Realm and becomes a knight, in which role he brings Mithegard, one of Alleble's neighbors, to become Alleble's ally in its war with Paragor. A favorite ruse of his, used in the first and third books, is to disguise himself in the livery of Paragor in order to infiltrate the latter's territory. Aidan is revealed in The Final Storm to be one of the 'Three Witnesses'; one of three prophesied heroes who bring about the final end of the said war. Aidan's name as a Witness is "Seeker of the Lost". He is killed by Paragor after he refuses Paragor's offers of wealth and glory; but is revived moments later to defeat Paragor's army. Before he becomes Witness he wields the sword called Fury, which had earlier belonged to his mentor Captain Valithor; but once revived, he wields Adoric, "The Glory Seeker". Aidan is the only Witness to have visited the Realm more than once, and the only one to have returned from it.

Gwenne: A Glimpse swordmaiden of the Elder Guard. One of Aidan's most intimate friends. Gwenne is typically audacious and lighthearted, but can be passionate and reliable. Aidan is very fond of her. Her sword is called Thil Galel ("Daughter of Light" in the language of Glimpses).

Antoinette Lynn Reed: Gwenne's human counterpart. Antoinette is a classmate of Aidan's, who having learned of the war continuing in the Realm is brought to Alleble, where she takes Gwenne's place. As a swordmaiden of Alleble, Antoinette joins a diplomatic mission to revive the faith in Alleble of the vassal Yewland. She is skilled at the art of kendo, rambunctious, and sometimes danger-prone. Her personality is similar to Gwenne's, but lacks Gwenne's emotional maturity. Antoinette is revealed in The Final Storm to be one of the Three Witnesses, one of three prophesied heroes who bring an end to the war between Alleble and Paragory. Antoinette's name as a Witness is "Child of Storms". This is ironic, because Antoinette is said throughout Rise of the Wyrm Lord to have suffered a trauma in near-infancy during a thunderstorm; as a result of this trauma, she is attuned to weather and is instantly aware of an approaching storm and its intensity. The irony may serve to indicate the ability of King Eliam (to whom the Glimpses of Alleble attribute "all that is just and good") to generate positive effects even from the least likely sources. As Witness she wielded the sword Thorinsagaet, the "Storm Bringer".

Wyrm Lord: Oldest of the Realm's dragons, whose envy and hate have corrupted him. In the second book, he arises from long imprisonment (given as a punishment for his murder of Torin, King Eliam's most faithful servant) to aid Paragor. His servants are seven lupine creatures called the Seven Sleepers, who like him have the power of shape-changing. It is suggested that the Wyrm Lord caused the Realm to separate from the readers' world. His 'Black Breath', which obscures vision, creates a frightening backdrop for the Final Storm after which the third book is named. He dies as a result of having ingested the blood of Falon the mortiwraith.

Zabediel/Zabed: A scribe in the service of King Eliam. Zabed has lived for millennia. It was he who wrote on the scroll taken from Sil Arnoth the location of the Wyrm Lord, and the prophecies of Paragor's rise and that of the Three Witnesses. Zabediel is known to have lived, until the third book's beginning, in the secluded village of Balesparr. From there, he was taken by Paragor and imprisoned. He was freed by Aidan and Antionette, to whom he revealed the prophecy, and later killed while trying to escape Paragory. The suffix of his name means "of God" in Hebrew and is commonly used to name angels.

Audiobooks
On April 5, 2008 Wayne Thomas Batson announced on The Realm Forums that Thomas Nelson (publisher) would be producing an audiobook series of the trilogy. Availability will be on CD, Audible and iTunes, and the release date was scheduled for October 2010–January 2011.

References

External links
 Wayne Batson's blog

Fantasy novel trilogies